Soft Machine is an album by Teddybears. It was released on 12 September 2006 on Big Beat Recordings and Columbia Records. It was the first album the band released under the name Teddybears, as they had previously been Teddybears STHLM.

Excluding "Intro", "Riot Going On" is the only new song from the group. The rest are reproductions of tracks found on their previous albums Fresh and Rock 'n' Roll Highschool, with "Throw Your Hands Up" renamed "Are You Feelin' It?".

Track listing

Musicians

Teddybears
 Patrik Arve
 Joakim Åhlund
 Klas Åhlund

Additional musicians
 Sarah Dawn Finer - backing vocals (track 3)
 Annie - backing vocals (track 4)
 Irma Schultz - backing vocals (track 4)
 Andreas Kleerup - drums (track 7)
 Erik Olsson - drums & vibraphone (track 10)
 Desmond Foster - backing vocals (track 11)

References

2006 albums
Teddybears (band) albums